Tommy Noonan (born Thomas Noone; April 29, 1921 – April 24, 1968) was a comedy genre film performer, screenwriter and producer. He acted in a number of high-profile films as well as B movies from the 1940s through the 1960s, and he is best known for his supporting performances as Gus Esmond, wealthy fiancé of Lorelei Lee (Marilyn Monroe) in Gentlemen Prefer Blondes (1953), and as the musician Danny McGuire in A Star Is Born (1954). He played a stockroom worker in the film Bundle of Joy (1956) with Eddie Fisher and Debbie Reynolds.

Early years
Born in Bellingham, Washington, Noonan was the younger half-brother of actor John Ireland.

Noonan was the son of Michael James Noone and Gracie Ferguson. His father was a vaudeville comedian and a native of Garrafrauns, Dunmore, Galway County, Ireland. His mother, a piano teacher, was from Glasgow, Scotland. He attended New York University.

Career 
In 1934, Noonan and Ireland made their stage debuts with a New York-based experimental theater. They later appeared together in three films, including I Shot Jesse James (1949).

Noonan had a repertory company of his own prior to World War II. On Broadway, Noonan appeared in How to Make a Man (1960) and Men to the Sea (1944).

After serving in the United States Navy during World War II, Noonan made his film debut in George White's Scandals (1945).

He teamed with Peter Marshall to form a comedy team in the late 1940s. (Noonan and Marshall were related by marriage; Noonan's half-brother John Ireland was married to Marshall's sister Joanne Dru.) The team's performances were limited because they continued their individual careers, "working together only when both were available at the same time". Working as Noonan and Marshall, they appeared on television, nightclubs, and in the films Starlift (1951), FBI Girl (1951) (in a brief appearance), The Rookie (1959), and Swingin' Along (1962). They also wrote for other comics, including Rowan and Martin, which led to Marshall holding a lifelong grudge against Dan Rowan after Noonan fell ill near the end of his life and Rowan paid Noonan almost no attention. The duo went their separate ways after the release of Swingin' Along.

In 1953, Noonan appeared in the classic musical movie Gentlemen Prefer Blondes as Gus Esmond, the nerdy fiancé of Marilyn Monroe's character Lorelei Lee, whereas in 1954, Noonan played Danny McGuire, Judy Garland's bandmate, accompaniest, and friend in the Warner Brother's film "A Star Is Born." Also, he played a voyeuristic bank manager in the Richard Fleischer Film Noir Melodrama, Violent Saturday  in 1955.

In 1961, Noonan appeared on the CBS courtroom drama Perry Mason as the defendant and episode's title character, comedian Charlie Hatch, in "The Case of the Crying Comedian."

In the early 1960s, Noonan appeared in a few B movies, including Promises! Promises! (1963) with Jayne Mansfield and 3 Nuts in Search of a Bolt (1964) with Mamie Van Doren, which he also directed, wrote and produced. His last effort as a producer was Cottonpickin' Chickenpickers (1967), which was also Sonny Tufts' last movie.

Personal life 
Noonan was married five times. His last wife was actress Carole Langley whose stage name was Pocahontas Crowfoot. They were married 16 years and had four children.  Noonan also had a daughter from his first marriage and son from his second marriage.

Death 
Eight months after an operation for a brain tumor, Noonan died in 1968 at the Motion Picture & Television Country House and Hospital, just a few days shy of his 47th birthday. He was buried in San Fernando Mission Cemetery.

Partial filmography

References

External links

 
 

American male film actors
American male stage actors
American film directors
1921 births
1968 deaths
20th-century American male actors
Burials at San Fernando Mission Cemetery
Deaths from brain cancer in the United States
Deaths from cancer in California